Jerry Blaivas is an American urologist and senior faculty at the Icahn School of Medicine at Mount Sinai in New York City and adjunct professor of Urology at SUNY Downstate Medical School in Brooklyn, as well as professor of clinical urology at College of Physicians and Surgeons, Columbia University and clinical professor of Urology at Weill Medical College of Cornell University.    He has four patents pending; received four research grants for which he served as the principal investigator; as of 2018 published 216 peer-reviewed articles, 14 books and 219 book chapters and served as a major in the United States Army assigned to the Walson Army Hospital. He served as president, Urodynamic Society (1992 – 1993).

Biography

Blaivas received his MD at Tufts School of Medicine in 1968; his internship and residency in general surgery were at Boston City Hospital, 1968 – 1971. His residency in urology was at Tufts New England Medical Center from 1973 – 1976, and his certification with the American Board of Urology, where he has also served as an examiner, in 1978. Blaivas is married and has three children.

Research
Blaivas’ research has concentrated on BPH, urinary incontinence, and vaginal mesh complications. His pending patents focus on technological applications of data capture and medical information system. He was Principal Investigator on three grants focused on Multiple sclerosis and has been funded by the National Multiple Sclerosis Society. Two of the projects studied voiding disturbances. He has been active in classification systems for incontinence, detrusor-external sphincter dyssynergia, overactive bladder, urinary urgency, nocturia, bladder outlet obstruction in women and urethral strictures. Many of his peer-reviewed articles are on urethral reconstruction in women, and he has performed over 140 urethral reconstructions.

Professional activities 
He was president of the Urodynamic Society (1992 – 1993), and founder and Editor-in-Chief  of its journal Neurology and Urodynamics through 2007. In 1988, he founded (and is the medical director of) the Institute for Bladder and Prostate Research, a not-for-profit dedicated to research about treatment options for urological conditions, and is now their medical director. He is the Chief Scientific Officer, Symptelligence Medical Informatics LLC. He is the chairman of three councils of the American Urological Association:  the New Technology Council  (1993 – 1997), the Biomedical Engineering Committee  (1990 - 1993), and the Voiding Dysfunction Committee, (1996 - 2000)

Honors and awards
Partial list
 Ferdinand C. Valentine Award, New York Academy of Medicine, 2015 
 “Four Fathers,” Society of Urodynamics, Female Pelvic Medicine & Urogenital Reconstruction, 2013
 Victor A. Politano Award, American Urological Association, 2009
 Establishment of the Annual Jerry G. Blaivas Honorary Lectureship, Society of Urodynamics and Female Urology, in 2007 in his honor. 
 Continence Care Champion, National Association for Continence, 2005
 Lifetime Achievement Award, Society for Urodynamics and Female Urology, 1999
 Brantley Scott, M.D., Award, American Foundation for Urologic Disease, 1999
 J. Marion Sims Lecture, American Uro-Gynecologic Society, 1993

Publications

Books edited
NeuroUrology and Urodynamics: Principles and Practice, Edited by Yalla S, McGuire EM, Elbadawi A, Blaivas JG, New York, MacMillan Publishing Co., 1988 
Practical Neurourology: Genitourinary Complications in Neurourologic Disease, Edited by Blaivas JG, Chancellor MB. Butterworth-Heineman, Boston, 1995. 
Topics in Clinical Urology: Evaluation and Treatment of Urinary Incontinence, Edited by Blaivas JG. Igaku-Shoin. New York,1996. 
Blaivas JG, Chancellor MB, Verhaaren MR, Weiss JP (eds.). Atlas of Urodynamics (2nd Ed.), Wiley-Blackwell, 2007. 
Blaivas JG, Weiss JP. Benign Prostatic Hyperplasia and Lower Urinary Tract Symptoms, an Issue of Urologic Clinics (The Clinics: Internal Medicine). Saunders/Elsevier Health Sciences, 2009. 
Blaivas, JG, Purohit, RS, Diagnosis and Treatment of Overactive Bladder, Oxford University Press, New York, 2011 
Weiss, JP, Blaivas, JG, van Kerrebroeck, PEV, Wein, AJ, Nocturia: Causes, Consequences and Clinical Approaches, Springer, New York, 2012

Nonprofessional books
Blaivas JG. Conquering Bladder and Prostate Problems: an Authoritative Guide for Men and Women, Plenum Publishing Corp. New York, 1998.

Articles
His most-cited peer-reviewed articles according to Google Scholar:

Leach GE, Dmochowski RR, Appell RA, Blaivas JG, Hadley HR, Luber KM, Mostwin JL, O'Donnell PD, Roehrborn CG. Female Stress Urinary Incontinence Clinical Guidelines: Panel summary report on surgical management of female stress urinary incontinence.  J Urol. 1997 Sep;158(3 Pt 1):875-80.  Cited by 895 articles as of 2019
Abrams P, Blaivas JG, Stanton SL, Andersen JT. The standardisation of terminology of lower urinary tract function. The International Continence Society Committee on Standardisation of Terminology. Scand J Urol Nephrol Suppl. 1988;114:5-19.  Cited by 598 related articles as of 2019
Blaivas JG1, Olsson CA. Stress incontinence: classification and surgical approach,. J Urol. 1988 Apr;139(4):727-31.  Cited by 537  articles as of 2019
Bladder outlet obstruction nomogram for women with lower urinary tract symptomatology. Blaivas JG, Groutz A. Neurourol Urodyn. 2000;19(5):553-64.  Cited by 408 articles as of 2019
. Blaivas JG, Chaikin DC.Pubovaginal fascial sling for the treatment of all types of stress urinary incontinence: surgical technique and long-term outcome Urol Clin North Am. 2011 Feb;38(1):7-15, v. doi: 10.1016/j.ucl.2010.12.002. Review.  Cited by 400  articles as of 2019

References

External links
Neurology and Urodynamics
Mesh News Desk: Renowned Urologist for the Plaintiffs Does Not Use Synthetic Mesh

American urologists
Living people
Icahn School of Medicine at Mount Sinai faculty
Columbia University faculty
Cornell University faculty
United States Army officers
Year of birth missing (living people)